WBZ may refer to:

 WBZ (AM), an AM radio station (1030 AM) in Boston
 WBZ-FM, an FM radio station (98.5 FM)
 WBZ-TV, a television station (channel 20, virtual 4)